A trial run is a preliminary test of the suitability of a thing or a process.

Trial Run may refer to:
 Trial Run (1969 film), US TV movie
 Trial Run (1984 film), New Zealand
Trial Run, play by Nigel Williams (author)